Christopher R. Bunch (December 22, 1943 – July 4, 2005) was an American science fiction, fantasy and television writer, who wrote and co-wrote about thirty novels.

Early life and education
Bunch was born in Fresno, California and attended Mira Costa High School with his friend Allan Cole. He joined the United States Army and served 14 months in Vietnam during the Vietnam War in 1965–66. He was a patrol commander. He attended California State University, Los Angeles.

Career
He collaborated with Allan Cole on a series of books involving a hero named Sten in a galactic empire. He also wrote for Rolling Stone and was a correspondent for Stars and Stripes. He died in his hometown of Ilwaco, Washington, after a long battle with a lung ailment.

List of works

Solo novels, series and short stories

The Seer King Trilogy
The Seer King (1997)
The Demon King (1998)
The Warrior King (1999)

Dragonmaster Trilogy
Storm of Wings (2002)
Knighthood of the Dragon (2003)
The Last Battle (2004)

Dragonmaster is an action trilogy following the life and exploits of Hal Kailas, a peasant who left home at an early age. During his early years Hal must work as a casual laborer. His dream is to fly dragons, so he joins a traveling troupe who give rides on dragons as entertainment from town to town. Hal is away from his home country and his king, Asir. When war breaks out, he is drafted into the army as an unwilling soldier. However, he does his best and works his way through the ranks of the army and society with his heroic exploits. Dragons are mainly wild and untamed creatures that are brought into the war, while Hal and others devise new and more damaging ways to use the dragons against their enemies. This tale is told in the first two books, which contain bloody action throughout. The third book covers life after the war, the difficulties ex-soldiers face, and how Hal deals with it.

The Last Legion
The Last Legion (1999)
Firemask (2000)
Storm Force (2000)
Homefall (2001)

Shadow Warrior
Shadow Warrior: The Wind After Time (1996)
Shadow Warrior: Hunt the Heavens (1996)
Shadow Warrior: Darkness of God (1997)

Star Risk Series
Star Risk, Ltd. (2002)
The Scoundrel Worlds (2003)
The Doublecross Program (2004)
The Dog From Hell (2005)

An outlined novel in the Star Risk, Ltd. series, The Gangster Conspiracy (2007), was finished by Bunch's friend Steve Perry and his son, Dal Perry.

The Shannon Trilogy
A Daughter of Liberty
The War of the Shannons
A Reckoning for Kings

Novels
The Empire Stone (2000)
Corsair (2001)
Corsair follows the tale of Gareth Radnor, who goes to live with his rich uncle, after the death of his parents at the hands of the evil Lynathi slavers. He has to leave the city after a prank goes wrong and someone dies. He quickly makes a life for himself at sea but always longs to revenge his parents and the other villagers. When an opportunity comes, he takes it and makes a name for himself and a fortune as a pirate, and gains public support for his revenge on the Lynathi.
His two childhood friends, and two more from when he lived with his uncle in the city of Ticao, travel with him on his adventures; one is Cosyra, his love interest.

Short stories
"Tarnished Glory" (2002) (collected in Harry Turtledove's anthology Alternate Generals II)
"Murdering Uncle Ho" (2005) (collected in Harry Turtledove's anthology Alternate Generals III)

Novels and series co-authored with Allan Cole

Sten
Known as The Sten Chronicles (or sometimes the Sten Adventures), this series of books is set in the far future of mankind. While the main attraction of the series was the action and understated humor, the series was actually a political critique. It had seemed to Bunch and Cole that entirely too many science fiction authors were enamored with monarchies and their consequent fascist (although benevolent) ideals. They wanted to write a series to show the realities of politics and power and to place a working-class man into this series, letting the reader see through his eyes and watch as he grows to be a real and realistic hero.

 Sten (1982)
 The Wolf Worlds (1984)
 The Court of a Thousand Suns (1985)
 Fleet of the Damned (1988)
 Revenge of the Damned (1989)
 The Return of the Emperor (1990)
 Vortex (1992)
 Empire's End (1993)

Anteros
The Far Kingdoms (1985)
The Warrior's Tale (1994)
Kingdoms of the Night (1995)

Novels
A Reckoning for Kings (1987)—a historical novel set during the Tet Offensive of the Vietnam War

See also

Notes

External links
 
 Interview at SFFWorld.com
 

1943 births
2005 deaths
20th-century American novelists
21st-century American novelists
20th-century American male writers
21st-century American male writers
American fantasy writers
American male novelists
American science fiction writers
United States Army soldiers
Writers from Fresno, California
People from Ilwaco, Washington
California State University, Los Angeles alumni
United States Army personnel of the Vietnam War